The 2019 FIM Bajas World Cup season was the 8th season of the FIM Bajas World Cup, an international rally raid competition for motorbikes and quads.

Calendar
The calendar for the 2019 season will feature four baja-style events. Some of the bajas are also part of 2019 FIA World Cup for Cross-Country Bajas.

Teams and riders

Results

Motorbikes

Quads

Championship standings

Riders' championship
 Points for final positions were awarded as follows:

Motorbikes

Quads

References

External links
 

FIM Cross-Country Rallies World Championship
Bajas World Cup
Bajas World Cup
Bajas World Cup